The Sony Vaio P series is a range of ultraportable subnotebook computers launched in January 2009.

It was marketed as a "lifestyle PC", although they share many characteristics with netbook computers.

Description 
The Sony Vaio P series features an 8" LED-backlit display with native resolution of 1600x768, coupled with Intel GMA 500 integrated graphics, an Intel Atom Silverthorne Z5x0 CPU with Intel Poulsbo US15W chipset, and up to 2GB of DDR2 memory. Notably, the P series sports non-upgradeable RAM that is soldered to the motherboard, with some models including just 1GB of RAM. It uses a pointing stick in the keyboard as its pointing device. Exact specs vary by region. An integrated "Motion Eye" webcam (optional in some models) is located on the upper right corner of the display bezel. Built-in GPS (some models), Bluetooth, 802.11 b/g/n wireless and 3G or HSDPA mobile broadband comprise its connectivity options. Like most ultraportables and netbooks, an internal optical drive is not present.

At launch, the pre-installed operating system was one of the 32-bit versions of Windows XP, which has lower resource requirements than Windows Vista. Several people have succeeded in installing various versions of Linux on the Vaio P, most notably Ubuntu Linux (Version 9.04, Jaunty). Ubuntu is arguably the best alternative due to its ease of installation and configuration, and the fact that it allows for full 3D graphics to be utilized. Since the release of Windows 7, the P series now ships with that OS installed. The P series has been criticized for poor performance in part due to the excessive pre-installed software, but also because of the poor performance of the integrated graphics.

Compared with most other Intel Atom-based netbooks, the P series was considerably more expensive. However, the Atom Silverthorne platform adopted by the P series sported lower power consumption and higher-clocked processor options compared to the more common Diamondville platform. Later models of the Vaio P included these faster CPUs. In addition, the P series is the lightest device in its class, weighing roughly the same as the Apple iPad 2 tablet and less than all 10" netbooks, and the 7" Asus Eee PC models. The 1600x768 resolution of the P series' 8" display is also comparable to that of much larger laptops, such as the 12.1" Thinkpad X200s and its 1440x900 resolution.

Launch specs 
The Vaio P was launched in five colour options: Dove White, Emerald Green, Glossy Black, Gold, and Sangria Red.

Dependent on the model, storage was a 60GB or 80GB hard disk drive, or 64GB, 128GB, or 256GB solid state drive.

Minor model updates included Windows 7, larger SSDs, and faster Atom processors.

May 2010 update 
The VPC-P11 series launched in May 2010 featured a refreshed exterior, an accelerometer to enable switching from landscape to portrait mode, a tiny 16mmx16mm touchpad built into the LCD bezel, and a choice of five colours - 'electric orange, neon green, hot pink, icy white and classic black'. In addition, a button was added to instantly switch the screen to 1280x600 resolution, in order to make text more readable, as well as a digital compass, ambient light sensor, and higher-capacity battery (2500mAh).

The 2010 revision was the last iteration of the P series, with Sony discontinuing the product in 2011. The P series clamshell format was incorporated in Sony's Tablet P, which was released in November 2011.

Specifications 
Dimensions: 9.65"(W) x 0.78"(H) x 4.72"(D); 24.5 cm(W) x 2 cm(H) x 12 cm(D)
Weight: 1.3 lbs (589g, VPC-P11 series); 1.4 lbs (635g, at launch with SSD), 1.5 lbs (680g, at launch with HDD)
Processor: Intel Atom single-core (with Hyperthreading) Z520, Z530, Z540, Z550 or Z560, at 1.33, 1.6, 1.87, 2.0, or 2.13 GHz; Z560-equipped models were not released in the US
Graphics: Intel GMA 500
Memory: 1 or 2 GB DDR2 SDRAM running at 533 MHz
Storage: 60 or 80 GB 4200 RPM PATA HDD, or 64 GB, 128 GB or 256 GB SSD
Connectivity: Wi-Fi 802.11 b/g/n, Integrated Stereo A2DP Bluetooth technology, wireless broadband (technology used varies by region, including WiMax, HSDPA and 3G), GPS (model-dependent)
Display: 8" 1600x768 LED TFT active matrix backlit display, 0.3 MP webcam
Expansion Slots: Memory Stick (Standard/Duo) media slot, SD/SDHC memory card slot
Interface: 2 USB 2.0 type-A ports, DC-in, Display/LAN Adapter port, headphone jack
Battery at launch: standard 2100mAh (145 grams), extended 4200mAh (263 grams)
Battery for VPC-P11 series: standard 2500mAh (155 grams), extended 5000mAh (250 grams)

USA models 

(note color codes: /G - Emerald Green, /Q Glossy Black, /R Sangria Red, /W Dove White, /N gold, /P /PI pink, /D white, /B black)

Launch dates 
VGN-P500 series - January/February 2009
VGN-P600 series - July 2009
VGN-P700 series - October 2009
VPC-P11 series - May 2010

See also 
 Sony VAIO C1 series
 Vaio
 Netbook
 UMPC

References

External links 
 Official Website
 Full Sony VAIO P review
 Hands-on review from engadget

Subnotebooks
Netbooks